Entertainment One Ltd., trading as eOne, is an American-owned Canadian multinational entertainment company. Based in Toronto, Ontario, the company is primarily involved in the acquisition, distribution, and production of films and television series. The company was listed on the London Stock Exchange before it was acquired by Hasbro on December 30, 2019.

History

Establishment 
The company has its origins in the music distributor Records on Wheels Limited (which was established in 1970), and the music retail chain CD Plus. The chain was in the process of acquiring other companies to bolster its wholesale operations in music and home video, leading to its purchase of ROW in 2001. Its vice president of operations, Darren Throop, had joined the company after CD Plus acquired his Halifax-based record store chain Urban Sound Exchange. The combined company later became known as ROW Entertainment, with Throop as president and CEO. The company listed itself on the Toronto Stock Exchange as an income trust, meaning that its taxes were paid by its shareholders, rather than the company itself.

Afterward, ROW began to diversify its operations into content ownership. In June 2005, it acquired the American independent music distributor and home entertainment publisher Koch Entertainment. Afterwards, it was re-incorporated as Entertainment One Income Fund.

In 2007, the company accepted a $188 million public equity takeover by Marwyn Investment Management to fund its expansion; the company was listed on London's Alternative Investment Market as Entertainment One Ltd.

Expansion 
In 2007, Entertainment One acquired Montreal-based film distributor Seville Pictures and UK distributor Contender Entertainment Group. The same year, the company secured its first film output agreement with Summit Entertainment, handling distribution in Canada and the United Kingdom, and acquired British film distributor Contender Entertainment. Acquisitions continued in 2008 with the purchase of the Benelux distributor RCV Entertainment. The same year, eOne acquired the television studios Blueprint and Barna-Alper, and international television distributor Oasis International. Throop stated that the company was attempting to "replicate the success of Alliance Atlantis", with a focus on diversifying into production alongside distribution. Also in 2008, the company listed itself on the London Stock Exchange.

On April 12, 2011, eOne acquired Australian distribution company Hopscotch for £12.9 million. On May 28, 2012, eOne placed a bid to purchase the Canadian film distributor Alliance Films from Goldman Sachs Group and Investissement Québec. The deal was completed on January 9, 2013, giving eOne Canadian distribution rights for titles from The Weinstein Company, Lionsgate, CBS Films, FilmDistrict and Focus Features. On May 28, 2014, eOne announced a strategic investment in interactive agency Secret Location; the firm would continue to operate independently under the leadership of James Milward (President, Executive Producer and Founder), and partners Pietro Gagliano (Creative Director and SVP) and Ryan Andal (Technical Director and SVP). On June 2, 2014, eOne acquired Phase 4 Films; its CEO Berry Meyerowitz was named as head of eOne's U.S. film distribution business and North American family entertainment business. On July 17, the company acquired Paperny Entertainment. On August 28, 2014, eOne acquired Force Four Entertainment.

On January 5, 2015, eOne acquired a 51% stake in Mark Gordon's self-named studio, with an option to acquire the remainder at a later date. The purchase was part of an effort by eOne to bolster its presence in the United States. On September 9, 2015, eOne revived the Momentum Pictures brand (which was previously used by Alliance UK) and announced that it had entered into a multi-picture deal with Orion Pictures to jointly acquire films for "specialized theatrical releases" in the U.S., and targeted international releases, focusing on ancillary and digital distribution.

Marwyn Investment Management sold its 18% stake in Entertainment One to the Canada Pension Plan Investment Board (CPPIB) on September 16, 2015.

On September 30, 2015, eOne acquired a 70% stake in British animation studio Astley Baker Davies—producers of the animated children's series Peppa Pig. On December 16, 2015, eOne, Steven Spielberg, Reliance Entertainment, and Participant Media officially announced a joint venture known as Amblin Partners. eOne served as an investor, while the majority of its films would be distributed by Universal Pictures.

On January 7, 2016, eOne made a strategic investment in Sierra Pictures and on January 20, 2016, the company acquired Dualtone Music Group. On March 8, 2016, eOne the acquired music recording, publishing and artist management company Last Gang, and announced that its founder Chris Taylor would join the company as president of music. In 2016, eOne acquired a majority stake in unscripted production company Renegade 83.

On February 24, 2016, Entertainment One reached a home media distribution deal with 20th Century Fox Home Entertainment to release eOne's titles on DVD and Blu-ray in the UK.

On August 10, 2016, eOne rejected an offer to be acquired by British television broadcaster ITV plc for £1 billion ($1.3 billion US). eOne considered the offer to be "fundamentally undervalued".

On August 17, 2016, eOne announced that it would acquire Secret Location outright for an undisclosed amount. On September 12, 2016, eOne announced its acquisition of UK-based music management company Hardlivings. That same year, eOne acquired music management company Nerve.

On September 9, 2016, eOne reached a first look co-financing and international distribution deal with Tucker Tooley's Tooley Productions.

In 2016, eOne entered into an agreement with Ole (now Anthem Entertainment) to administer its catalogue.

eOne consolidated its film and television studios into a single structure in 2017, as part of an effort to reposition its operations towards production rather than acquisitions and "large output deals".

On May 17, 2017, eOne joined with Hollywood producer Brad Weston to launch global content creation studio MAKEREADY. The deal secured distribution rights for eOne in its territories and Universal in all other territories worldwide.

In 2017, eOne joined Participant Media, Reliance Entertainment, Alibaba Pictures and Universal Pictures in backing Amblin Partners, a content creation company led by Steven Spielberg.

On January 29, 2018, eOne acquired the remaining 49% in The Mark Gordon Co., and Gordon was named eOne's new president and chief content officer of film, television and digital.

On March 26, 2018, eOne acquired live entertainment company Round Room Live, which organizes major tours including PJ Masks among others.

On April 9, 2018, eOne acquired UK non-scripted production company Whizz Kid Entertainment. Later that year, eOne joined a round of investment in Jeffrey Katzenberg's short-form digital content venture "NewTV" (later renamed Quibi).

On March 5, 2019, eOne's Benelux division was acquired by a new company named WW Entertainment, founded by Wilco Wolfers and Caspar Wenckebach. As a result, all eOne Benelux titles, including future releases, have since moved to WW. Later that month, Entertainment One ended their home media distribution agreement with 20th Century Fox Home Entertainment following Fox's purchase by The Walt Disney Company on March 20, 2019. eOne reached an agreement with Universal Pictures Home Entertainment to handle home media distribution of its films and television series in Australia, Canada, Germany, Spain, New Zealand, the US, and the UK.

In 2019, eOne acquired UK-based unscripted company Daisybeck Studios. That same year, eOne acquired American long-form nonfiction producer BLACKFIN. Also in 2019, eOne Music acquired Audio Network, a British company involved in the production of music for film and television, for $215 million.

Acquisitions and targets 
Since listing on the London Stock Exchange's AIM submarket, eOne has made a series of acquisitions.
 On June 14, 2007, eOne acquired Contender Entertainment Group, one of the largest distributors of TV content in the UK. 
 On August 17, 2007, eOne acquired Seville Entertainment Inc. for an undisclosed sum. 
 On January 9, 2008, eOne acquired the Netherlands-based distributor RCV Entertainment. 
 On July 4, 2008, eOne acquired TV producers Blueprint Entertainment and Barna-Alper Productions as well as domestic distributors Oasis International and Maximum Films. 
 On April 12, 2011, eOne acquired Australian distribution company Hopscotch for £12.9 million. 
 On January 22, 2013, eOne acquired Alliance Films. 
 On June 2, 2014, eOne acquired Phase 4 Films.
 On July 17, 2014, eOne acquired Paperny Entertainment.
 On August 28, 2014, eOne acquired Force Four Entertainment.
 In May 2014, eOne made a strategic equity investment in interactive agency Secret Location, and later took full control.
 In January 2015, eOne acquired a 51% stake in The Mark Gordon Company, the production studio behind such TV series as Quantico, Grey's Anatomy, Army Wives, Ray Donovan and Criminal Minds; and films such as Steve Jobs, Source Code, The Day After Tomorrow, and Speed. It acquired the remaining 49% on January 30, 2018.
 On September 30, 2015, eOne acquired a controlling stake on Astley Baker Davies thus increasing its ownership of the preschool franchise Peppa Pig.
 On March 26, 2018, eOne acquired Round Room Entertainment, a live entertainment company, founded by Stephen Shaw in 2016.
 On April 9, 2018, eOne acquired a majority 70% stake in British-based Whizz Kid Entertainment, producer of Ex on the Beach.
 On April 11, 2019, eOne acquired UK-based Audio Network, an independent creator and publisher of original music for use in film, television, advertising and digital media.
 On July 11, 2019, eOne acquired British factual producer Daisybeck Studios.
 On September 12, 2019, eOne acquired US-based, nonfiction content producer Blackfin.

Hasbro ownership era 
On August 22, 2019, American toy and media company Hasbro announced that it had reached an agreement to acquire Entertainment One for US$4 billion. Throop cited that its goals to "unlock the power and value of creativity" were "[aligned] with Hasbro's corporate objectives", and would be enhanced by access to Hasbro's properties and merchandising capabilities. eOne's Canadian operations will be structured in such a way as to maintain eligibility for Canadian content classification. The deal was approved by the Ontario Superior Court of Justice. On November 21, 2019, the United Kingdom's Competition and Markets Authority (CMA) announced that it would investigate the purchase under British competition law, to determine if it would result in a lessening of competition. The sale was completed on December 30, 2019, with the company becoming a wholly owned subsidiary of the company. Throop remains CEO of eOne, reporting to Hasbro CEO Brian Goldner. The UK CMA cleared the acquisition the following month. On April 30, 2020, eOne had an untitled Transformers animated film in development.

On October 9, 2020, eOne took over as Hasbro's new production arm and began development and distribution of content based on properties from the toy company, resulting in Allspark being absorbed into the acquired company. On February 10, 2021, it was announced that eOne would be laying off 10% of its film and television staff.

On April 26, 2021, eOne announced that it would sell its music division to The Blackstone Group for $385 million. The acquisition was closed in June 2021, after which it was renamed MNRK Music Group.

On August 22, 2022, it was reported that Hasbro was seeking to sell or restructure its media assets. On the same day, It was announced that CEO Darren Throop would be stepping down at the end of the year. On November 1, 2022, Hasbro confirmed that it was selling the Irish animation studio Boulder Media to the Australian animation studio Princess Pictures.

On November 17, 2022, Hasbro, Inc. announced that is selling part of Entertainment One's TV and film business not directly supporting the Hasbro Branded Entertainment strategy, which includes all non-Hasbro assets ranging from scripted and unscripted television and films, but would exclude the company's ex-children's properties like Peppa Pig, which were already consolidated under Hasbro.

Divisions

Films 

The film division was initially involved primarily in acquiring films for international distribution, but has since shifted its resources towards producing and funding its own films.

eOne Films was formed in 2007, and acquired the Montreal-based Séville Pictures soon afterwards. In 2012, the company announced that it would acquire Alliance Films for CDN$225 million, which also added the assets of Maple Pictures and Momentum Pictures to its holdings. eOne has also handled the Canadian distribution rights to the Miramax library, as well as the pre-2005 Dimension Films library.

On May 8, 2015, eOne consolidated its film production and international sales units into a new unit known as eOne Features, with a goal to self-produce and finance six-to-eight films per-year. On December 16, 2015, it was announced that eOne would be an investor in Amblin Partners, a joint venture between Steven Spielberg, Reliance Entertainment, Participant Media, and Universal Pictures. One of the first film projects under this banner was 2015's Eye in the Sky.

On September 23, 2016, Xavier Dolan's eOne-distributed film Juste la fin du monde was announced as Canada's entry in the Best Foreign Language Film category for the 89th Academy Awards.

On January 8, 2019, Universal Pictures acquired eOne's Australian and New Zealand self-distribution division. eOne distributed Universal's Best Picture winner Green Book in 2019. eOne has also distributed Best Picture winner Spotlight and Best Picture nominee 1917.

In 2020, eOne was the top distributor in the UK, taking around 15.3% of the total market.

Television 

eOne Television (formerly Barna-Alper Productions) is a television production company founded in 1980 by Laszlo Barna and Laura Alper and based in Toronto, Ontario. In April 2005, the company launched a distribution division, Barna-Alper Releasing. Entertainment One acquired Barna-Alper Productions Inc., Blueprint Entertainment, and distributor Oasis International in July 2008 to expand its television production and distribution capabilities. As part of a company-wide rebrand, the three companies were folded into E1 Television in January 2009.

Notable television series distributed or produced by eOne and its subsidiaries have included the three Ilana Frank-produced series Burden of Truth, Rookie Blue and Saving Hope, Bitten, The Book of Negroes, Border Security: Canada's Front Line, Call Me Fitz, Cardinal, Criminal Minds, Designated Survivor, Haven, Klondike, Mary Kills People, Naked and Afraid, Private Eyes, The Rookie, Siesta Key, The Walking Dead, and the HBO series Hung, Run, and Sharp Objects.

In 2013, eOne reached an agreement with AMC Networks to handle the international distribution of its original scripted productions, beginning with Halt and Catch Fire. The agreement expanded on existing pacts for the eOne-produced Hell on Wheels, and international distribution for The Walking Dead. The pact ended in May 2019 (with AMC having since expanded its in-house distribution business), although it will continue to handle international distribution for existing series, as well as The Walking Dead and Fear the Walking Dead.

Family & Brands 
eOne's Family & Brands division deals primarily in family-oriented intellectual property, including development, distribution, licensing, and marketing. The division has been seen growth credited to retail sales, licensing deals, and programming sales to broadcasters, accounting for US$202 million in revenue in 2018. It represented a year-over-year increase of 28%, with Peppa Pig and PJ Masks alone accounting for $114.9 million and $75.8 million respectively.

Virtual reality 
After making an investment in the company in 2014, eOne acquired the Toronto-based digital content studio Secret Location in 2016, which specializes in virtual and augmented reality experiences. In 2015, Secret Location won a Primetime Creative Arts Emmy Award in "Outstanding User Experience and Visual Design" for a tie-in to the drama series Sleepy Hollow. In 2020, the studio's first VR film The Great C won the Positron Visionary Award for Best Cinematic VR Experience at the 2020 Cannes XR Film Festival. That same year, Secret Location won the Outstanding Media Innovation Award by the Academy of Canadian Cinema & Television.

Productions

Films 
 40 Days and 40 Nights (2002)
 Little Children (2006)
 Never Back Down (2008)
 Harold and Kumar Escape from Guantanamo Bay (2008)
 Vicky Cristina Barcelona (2008) 
 Four Christmases (2008) 
 Milk (2008)
 The Reader (2008)
 The Time Traveler's Wife (2009) (Canadian distribution only, co-production with New Line Cinema, distributed by Warner Bros. Pictures in the United States)
 9 (2009)
 A Serious Man (2009)
 Law Abiding Citizen (2009)
 The Fighter (2010)
 Barney's Version (2010)
 Virginia (2010)
 Gnomeo & Juliet (2011) (British and Canadian distribution only, co-production with Touchstone Pictures, Rocket Pictures and Starz Animation)
 Midnight in Paris (2011)
 Starbuck (2011) (Australian distribution through Les Films Seville and Hopscotch Entertainment)
 Another Happy Day (2011)
 Bernie (2011)
 Beasts of the Southern Wild (2012) (Canadian distribution only, distributed by Fox Searchlight Pictures in the United States) 
 Looper (2012) (Spanish distribution only, co-production with TriStar Pictures, FilmDistrict and Endgame Entertainment, distributed by Sony Pictures Releasing in the United States) 
 Red Dawn (2012) (Canadian distribution only, distributed by FilmDistrict in the United States)
 Killing Them Softly (2012)
 Escape from Planet Earth (2013) (Canadian distribution only; co-production with The Weinstein Company, Kaleidoscope TWC and Rainmaker Entertainment)
 Admission (2013) (Canadian distribution only, distributed by Focus Features in the United States)
 Now You See Me (2013) (British distribution only, co-production with Summit Entertainment and K/O Paper Products, distributed by Lionsgate in the United States)
 2 Guns (2013) (British and Canadian distribution only, co-production with Foresight Unlimited and Emmett/Furla Films, distributed by Universal Pictures in the United States) 
 The Butler (2013) (Canadian distribution only, distributed by The Weinstein Company in the United States)
 Justin and the Knights of Valour (2013) (British distribution only; co-production with Kandor Graphics)
 Rush (2013) (Canadian distribution only, co-production with Exclusive Media, Cross Creek Pictures, Working Title Films and Imagine Entertainment, distributed by Universal Pictures in the United States)
 The Fifth Estate (2013) (British distribution only, co-production with Touchstone Pictures, DreamWorks Pictures, Reliance Entertainment and Participant Media, distributed by Walt Disney Studios Motion Pictures in the United States)
 Insidious: Chapter 2 (2013)
 American Hustle (2013) (Canadian distribution only, co-production with Columbia Pictures, Panorama Media and Annapurna Pictures, distributed by Sony Pictures Releasing in the United States)
 Walking with Dinosaurs (2013) (Canadian distribution only, co-production with Reliance Entertainment, IM Global and BBC Films, distributed by 20th Century Studios in the United States) 
 Lone Survivor (2013) (Spanish distribution only, co-production with Emmett/Furla Films and Film 44, distributed by Universal Pictures in the United States) 
 August: Osage County (2013)
 The Nut Job (2014) (Canadian distribution only, co-production with Red Rover International, ToonBox Entertainment and Gulfstream Pictures, distributed by Open Road Films in the United States)
 I, Frankenstein (2014) (New Zealand distribution only, co-production with Lakeshore Entertainment and SKE Films, distributed by Lionsgate in the United States)
 Enemy (2013) (Canadian distribution only, co-production with Pathé, distributed by A24 in the United States)
 What If... (2013) (co-production with CBS Films and Telefilm Canada)
 The Good Lie (2014) (British distribution only, co-production with Alcon Entertainment, Black Label Media and Imagine Entertainment, distributed by Warner Bros. Pictures in the United States)
 Child 44 (2015) (British and Canadian distribution only, co-production with Summit Entertainment, Worldview Entertainment and Scott Free Productions, distributed by Lionsgate in the United States)
 Insidious: Chapter 3 (2015)
 A Walk in the Woods (2015) (New Zealand distribution only, distributed by Broad Green Pictures in the United States) 
 Freeheld (2015) (British, Canadian and New Zealand distribution only, co-production with Endgame Entertainment and High Frequency Entertainment, distributed by Summit Entertainment in the United States) 
 The Dressmaker (2015) (Canadian distribution only, co-production with Screen Australia and Embankment, distributed by Amazon Studios and Broad Green Pictures in the United States and by Universal Pictures in Australia)
 Spotlight (2015) (international distribution only)
 Trumbo (2015) (international distribution only)
 Carol (2015) (Canadian distribution only, co-production with Film4, distributed by The Weinstein Company in the United States)
 The Young Messiah (2016) (Canadian distribution only, co-production with 1492 Pictures, distributed by Focus Features in the United States)
 Eye in the Sky (2015) (co-production with Bleecker Street)
 Florence Foster Jenkins (2016) (Canadian and New Zealand distribution only, co-production with Pathé and BBC Films, distributed by Paramount Pictures in the United States and by 20th Century Fox in the United Kingdom)
 Now You See Me 2 (2016) (British and Canadian distribution only, co-production with Summit Entertainment and K/O Paper Products, distributed by Lionsgate in the United States)
 Outlaws and Angels (2016)
 Bad Moms (2016) (Canadian distribution only, co-production with Huayi Brothers and Tang Media Productions, distributed by STX Entertainment in the United States) 
 Denial (2016) (British distribution only, co-production with Participant Media and BBC Films, distributed by Bleecker Street in the United States)
 Allied (2016)
 Lion (2016) (Canadian distribution only, co-production with Screen Australia and See-Saw Films, distributed by The Weinstein Company in the United States)
 Office Christmas Party (2016) (British distribution only, co-production with DreamWorks Pictures and Reliance Entertainment, distributed by Paramount Pictures in the United States)
 The Autopsy of Jane Doe (2016)
 Detroit (2017) (British, Canadian and Spanish distribution only, distributed by Annapurna Pictures in the United States)
 The Nut Job 2: Nutty by Nature (2017) (Canadian distribution only, co-production with Red Rover International, ToonBox Entertainment, Shanghai Hoongman, Suning and Gulfstream Pictures, distributed by Open Road Films in the United States; Warner Bros. Pictures in the United Kingdom and The Weinstein Company internationally)
 Logan Lucky (2017) (Canadian distribution only, co-production with Bleecker Street, distributed by Fingerprint Releasing in the United States)
 My Little Pony: The Movie (2017) (Canadian distribution only; co-production with Hasbro and DHX Media); distributed by Lionsgate in the United States
 Just Getting Started (2017) (Co-production with Endurance Media, distributed by Broad Green Pictures in the United States) 
 The Post (2017) (British distribution only; co-production with 20th Century Fox, DreamWorks Pictures, Reliance Entertainment, Amblin Entertainment, Star Thrower Entertainment and Participant Media)
 Molly's Game (2017) (co-production with STX Entertainment and The Mark Gordon Company)
 I Feel Pretty (2018) (Canadian and Spanish distribution only, co-production with Huayi Brothers, Tang Media Partners, Voltage Pictures and Wonderland Sound & Vision, distributed by STXfilms in the United States)
 If Beale Street Could Talk (2018) (British, Canadian and New Zealand distribution only, co-production with Annapurna Pictures, Plan B Entertainment and Pastel Productions, distributed by Mirror Releasing in the United States)
 Stan & Ollie (2018)
 Wild Rose (2019)
 Scary Stories to Tell in the Dark (2019) (co-production with Lionsgate and CBS Films)
 Official Secrets (2019) (co-production with IFC Films)
 Jexi (2019) (co-production with Lionsgate and CBS Films)
 Mary (2019) (co-production with TT Entertainment, distributed by RLJE Films)
 Midway (2019) (studio credit only, co-production with Lionsgate and Centropolis Entertainment)
 Queen & Slim (2019) (co-production with Universal Pictures, Makeready and Bron Studios)
 A Million Little Pieces (2019) (co-production with The Picture Company and Makeready, distributed by Momentum Pictures)
 1917 (2019) (UK and Ireland distribution only, with DreamWorks Pictures and Amblin Partners)
 The Turning (2020) (British and Spanish distribution only, co-production with DreamWorks Pictures and Reliance Entertainment, distributed by Universal Pictures in the United States)
 Love and Monsters (2020) (co-production with Paramount Pictures and 21 Laps Entertainment)
 Happiest Season (2020) (co-production with TriStar Pictures and Temple Hill Entertainment)
 The United States vs. Billie Holiday (2021) (British, Canadian and Spanish distribution only, co-production with Sierra/Affinity and RK Films, distributed by Hulu in the United States)
 Chaos Walking (2021) (Canadian and Spanish distribution only, distributed by Lionsgate in the United States) 
 Awake (2021) (co-production with Netflix)
 Snake Eyes (2021) (studio credit only, co-production with Paramount Pictures, Metro-Goldwyn-Mayer, Skydance Media and Di Bonaventura Pictures)
 Stillwater (2021) (British and Spanish distribution only, co-production with DreamWorks Pictures, Amblin Partners and Participant Media)
 Blue Bayou (2021) (studio credit only, co-production with Focus Features and Macro)
 Come from Away (2021) (co-production with Junkyard Dog Productions, RadicalMedia and Alchemy Production Group)
 The Starling (2021)
 My Little Pony: A New Generation (2021) (co-production with Netflix and Boulder Media)
 Clifford the Big Red Dog (2021) (British and Canadian distribution only, co-production with Paramount Pictures, The Kerner Entertainment Company, New Republic Pictures and Scholastic Entertainment)
 The 355 (2022) (Canadian distribution only, co-production with Genre Films, Freckle Films, FilmNation Entertainment and Huayi Brothers, distributed by Universal Pictures in the United States) 
 The Duke (2022) (Canadian, German and Spanish distribution only; produced by Ingenious Media, Screen Yorkshire and Pathé; distributed by Sony Pictures Classics in the United States and by Warner Bros. Pictures in the United Kingdom)
 Deep Water (2022)
 X (2022) (Spanish distribution only, distributed by A24 in the United States) 
 All the Old Knives (2022) 
 Mrs. Harris Goes to Paris (2022) (studio credit only; co-production with Hero Squared, Superbe Films and Moonriver Content; distributed by Focus Features in the United States and Universal Pictures internationally)
 Orphan: First Kill (2022) (co-production with Paramount Players, Dark Castle Entertainment, Sierra/Affinity, and Eagle Vision; distributed by Paramount Pictures in the United States, by Signature Entertainment in the United Kingdom and by VVS Films in Canada)
 The Woman King (2022) (British distribution only, co-production with TriStar Pictures, TSG Entertainment II, Welle Entertainment, JuVee Productions, and Jack Blue Productions)
 The Fabelmans (2022) (British distribution only, co-production with Amblin Entertainment, distributed by Universal Pictures in the United States)
 Distant (2023) (British distribution only, co-production with DreamWorks Pictures, Automatik Entertainment and Six Foot Turkey Productions)
 Dungeons & Dragons: Honor Among Thieves (2023) (British and Canadian distribution only; co-production with Paramount Pictures and Wizards of the Coast)
 Transformers: Rise of the Beasts (2023) (studio credit only, co-production with Paramount Pictures, Skydance Media, New Republic Pictures and Di Bonaventura Pictures)
 Play-Doh (TBA) (co-production with Electric Somewhere)

TV series 

Below is a list of productions eOne has been involved with either through production and/or distribution:

 The Adventures of Sinbad
 Arctic Air
 The Best Years
 Bitten
 Book of Negroes
 The Bridge
 Burden of Truth (Canadian production only)
 Call Me Fitz 
 Cardinal
 Clue 
 Cruel Summer 
 Degrassi (Canadian distribution only)
 Deputy
 Designated Survivor
 The Enfield Haunting
 Ex on the Beach
 Family Law
 Fear the Walking Dead
 The Firm (NBC TV series)
 From Dusk till Dawn: The Series
 Grey's Anatomy (season 14–present)
 Growing Up Hip Hop
 Growing Up Hip Hop: Atlanta
 Halt and Catch Fire
 Hap and Leonard
 Haven
 Hell on Wheels
 Heartland
 Hung
 The Hunger
 Ice
 InSecurity
 King
 Little Mosque on the Prairie
 Lost Girl (season 1 only, Canada only)
 Majority Rules!
 Made in Canada
 Manchild
 Mary Kills People
 Matador
 Men with Brooms
 Monsters
 Naked and Afraid
 Nurses (NBC TV series)
 Primeval: New World
 Power Rangers (2020–present)
 Private Eyes
 Rambo: New Blood
 Ransom
 ReGenesis
 The Rookie
 The Rookie: Feds
 Rookie Blue
 Run
 Sanctuary
 Saving Hope
 Salam Squad (Malaysian distribution only)
 Sharp Objects
 Show Me Yours
 Siesta Key
 Strictly Confidential
 Testees
 This Hour Has 22 Minutes
 Trailer Park Boys (season 9–present)
 The Turnout (in development)
 The Walking Dead
 Upright (Distribution outside of Australia and the UK)
 You Me Her (2016)

Kids & Family brands 

 Alien TV
 Ben & Holly's Little Kingdom
 Cupcake & Dino: General Services (2018)
 Humf 
 Lost and Found
 Magic Hockey Skates
 My Little Pony (2020–present)
 Ninja Express
 Pat & Stan
 Peppa Pig
 PJ Masks
 Ricky Zoom
 Tractor Tom
 Transformers (2020–present)
 Transformers: EarthSpark
 Treehouse Detectives
 Winston Steinburger and Sir Dudley Ding Dong (2016)

Virtual reality 
Below is a list of Secret Location VR games:

 The Great C
 Transpose
 Welcome to Wacken
 Blasters of the Universe
 Blasters of the Universe Infinity Forever
 Paranormal Pest Patrol
 NERF Ultimate Championship

Current and former names and logos
The company logo introduced in 2010 was designed by Toronto-based Parcel Design.

On September 8, 2015, Entertainment One announced a refreshed logo on the eve of Toronto International Film Festival.

References

External links 
 

 
1970 establishments in Ontario
Canadian companies established in 1970
Entertainment companies of Canada
Film distributors of Canada
Film production companies of Canada
Companies based in Toronto
Entertainment companies established in 1970
Mass media companies established in 1970
Companies formerly listed on the London Stock Exchange
2003 initial public offerings
2019 mergers and acquisitions
Hasbro subsidiaries
Canadian subsidiaries of foreign companies
Announced mergers and acquisitions